The Kanangra Creek, a perennial stream of the Hawkesbury-Nepean catchment, is located in the Blue Mountains region of New South Wales, Australia.

Course

The Kanangra Creek (officially designated as a river) rises near Mount Wallarra, below the Boyd Plateau on the western slopes of Mount Thurat, and flows generally south-east and north-east through Kanangra Gorge, joined by one minor tributary, before reaching its confluence with the Coxs River at Konangaroo Clearing. The river descends  over its  course. The river is entirely contained within the world heritage-listed Kanangra-Boyd National Park.

The Kanangra Falls, a waterfall located on the river, descends  in two drops.

Kanangra-Boyd Wilderness

The Kanangra-Boyd Wilderness is among the largest and most rugged wilderness areas in New South Wales.

See also

 List of rivers of Australia
 List of rivers of New South Wales (A–K)
 Rivers of New South Wales

References

External links
 

Rivers of New South Wales
Rivers of the Blue Mountains (New South Wales)
Oberon Council